is a Japanese bubble wrap keychain toy by Bandai. The term "puchipuchi" serves as a generic trademark for bubble wrap, but is also onomatopoeia for the sound of bubbles being popped.

The square-shaped toy has eight buttons that make a popping sound when pressed, and is designed to mimic the sensation of popping bubble wrap for an infinite number of times. It is made of a double-layer silicone rubber structure to create a similar feeling to bubble wrap. It also plays a sound effect for every 100 pops; these sound effects include a “door chime”, “barking dog”, “fart”, and “sexy voice”. Bandai worked with the company behind Puchipuchi bubble wrap to create a design that is most realistic to real bubble wrap.

Bandai has also created other keychain toys based on Mugen Puchipuchi, such as Puchi Moe, Mugen Edamame, and Mugen Periperi. The original Mugen Puchipuchi has also been marketed in Europe and North America as "Mugen Pop-Pop".

Puchi Moe 
Puchi Moe is an anime-themed version of the original Mugen Puchipuchi. The random sound effects have been replaced by one of four anime characters' voices. The different types, each based on an anime character archetype, are a childhood friend, French maid, tsundere, and younger sister.

Puchi Moe was created for the lucrative otaku market. All four character voices are done by voice actress Rie Kugimiya.

Mugen Edamame 
 has beans inside a pod that appears similar to edamame. Squeezing the pod causes a bean to pop out, showing one of twelve faces, which are pre-set and randomly packaged. Unlike Mugen Puchipuchi, it does not play sounds when pushed.

Mugen Periperi 
 mimics the tear strip of a cardboard box that is ripped to open the box. Mugen Periperi was made available on 22 November 2008.

Ouchi de Mugen Puchi Puchi Wii 
On 24 June 2008, Bandai released a video game version for the Nintendo Wii via WiiWare. The game's title, roughly translates to "In-Your-Home Infinite Bubble Wrap Wii".

References

External links 
 
Puchi Moe at Anisen.tv 
Mugen Edamame at Aso Vision 
Ouchi de Mugen Puchi Puchi Wii 

2000s toys
Bandai Namco franchises
Electronic toys